Hacettepe University is a leading state university in Ankara, Turkey. It was established on 8 July 1967. It is ranked first among the Turkish universities by URAP in 2021.

The university has two main campuses. In addition to these two main campuses, the School of Social Work is at Keçiören, and the Turkish State Conservatory in Ankara, affiliated with the university as of 1982, is at the Beşevler Campus.

General information

History

The history of Hacettepe University can be traced back to the establishment of the Institute of Child Health on 8 July 1958, and the inauguration of the Hacettepe Children's Hospital founded by Prof. Dr. İhsan Doğramacı. In 1961, the School of Health Sciences and its divisions of Nursing, Medical Technology, Physical Therapy and Rehabilitation and Nutrition were opened, all centered on the Institute of Child Health.

On 15 June 1963, Hacettepe University, Faculty of Medicine was established and a general teaching hospital was built. Three months later Hacettepe University School of Dentistry was established.

In the summer of 1964, a School of Basic Sciences was opened, offering courses in the natural sciences, social sciences and the humanities. At the time, all Hacettepe teaching institutions were affiliated to Ankara University and grouped under the title "Hacettepe Science Center".

Hacettepe University was chartered through Act No. 892 of the Turkish Parliament on 8 July 1967. Hacettepe Institutes of Higher Education formed the core of Hacettepe University, and the Faculties of Medicine, Science and Engineering, and Social and Administrative sciences were established.

In 1969, Hacettepe School of Pharmacy and Health Administration were established. In 1971, with a reorganization, the former schools were given faculty status and thus they became the Faculty of Dentistry, Faculty of Engineering, Faculty of Pharmacy and Faculty of Science. In 1973, the School of Technology was established. In 1982, the former faculties were reorganized as the Faculty of Letters, Faculty of Education, Faculty of Fine Arts, Faculty of Economic and Administrative Sciences and the Ankara State Conservatory was affiliated to Hacettepe University. In 1984, the School of Health services and in 1989, the School of Sport Sciences and Technology were established. Recently in 1998 the two Polatli; Vocational Schools and Kaman Vocational School have been established.

Official Seal
The emblem of the university was designed in 1967 by Dr. Yücel Tanyeri, then a second year medical student, in the likeness of a stag – the symbol of a Hittite deity discovered at the royal tombs in Alacahöyük. Inspired by this archeological symbol common to the region, the Stag was chosen as the symbol of the university, and was abstracted to represent a lowercase "h" – the first letter of the university's name.

Rankings

The Best Global Universities Ranking 2019 of the U.S. News & World Report, Hacettepe University is ranked 532nd (worldwide), and it is ranked first in Turkey and 176th globally in the subject area "Clinical Medicine. In 2019, University Ranking by Academic Performance (URAP) ranked Hacettepe University 534th in the world and best university in Turkey. In QS World University Rankings 2020, it is ranked 320th in the field of "Life Sciences and Medicine". Times Higher Education World University Rankings ranks Hacettepe University 501–600th in the world and 251–300th in the subject are "Clinical, pre-clinical & health" as of 2020. In the Academic Ranking of World Universities 2019, Hacettepe is ranked 301–400th in "Clinical Medicine".

Locally, Hacettepe University Faculty of Medicine is ranked the best in the country. Based on the minimum scores required to enroll in medical school, Hacettepe University holds the top spot among state schools for longer than a decade.

Campuses

Main Campus – Medical Center 
Main campus is in Sıhhiye, Ankara. In this campus are the following: Faculties of Dentistry, Faculty of Medicine and Pharmacy, Institutes of Child Health, Health Sciences, Neurological Sciences, Oncology, Public Health and Population Studies, and Schools of Health Administration, HeaIth Technology, Home Economics, Nursing, Physical Therapy and Rehabilitation and Health Services, Teaching Hospitals (the Adult Hospital, Ihsan Dogramaci Children's Hospital and the Oncology Hospital), a biomedical library, biomedical research units, student dormitories, sports and recreation centers and clubs.

Beytepe Campus

This campus is in Beytepe. The faculties of Economic and Administrative Sciences, Education, Engineering, Fine Arts, Letters and Natural Sciences, Institutes of History of Modern Turkey, Natural Sciences, Nuclear Sciences and Social Sciences and Schools of Foreign Languages, and the Vocational School of Technology, School of Sport Sciences and Technology, and administrative offices, library, student dormitories, sports and recreation centers are on this campus.

Hacettepe University currently has thirteen faculties, eight vocational schools, one conservatory, thirteen institutes and forty one research centres. 
Hacettepe University is a state university supported mainly by state funds allocated by the Turkish Parliament. Over 150 different undergraduate degree programs are offered and there are also over 200 different degree programs for postgraduate studies. The university has about 49,582 students enrolled for undergraduate studies and academic staff of 3.600.

Beytepe Campus also has a large artificial forest, where different sportive activities such as trekking, mountain-biking, running can be done and it is ideal for other recreational activities.

Other campuses

Beşevler Campus: (at the City Center) Houses the Turkish State Conservatory

Academic units

Faculties and schools

Faculties
 Faculty of Communication
 Faculty of Dentistry
 Faculty of Economics and Administrative Sciences
Economics
Business Administration
Family and Consumer Sciences
Health Administration
International Relations
Political Sciences and Public Administration
Public Finance
Social Work
 Faculty of Education
Computer Education and Instructional Technologies
Department of Educational Sciences
Curriculum and Instruction
Educational Administration
Supervision, Planning and Economics
Psychological Counselling and Guidance
Testing and Evaluation in Education
Department of Foreign Languages Teaching
English Language Teaching
French Language Teaching
German Language Teaching
Department of Primary Education
Elementary Teaching
Mathematics Teaching
Pre-School Teaching
Science Teaching
Department of Science and Mathematics for Secondary Education
Biology Education
Chemistry Education
Mathematics Education
Physics Education
 Faculty of Engineering
Chemical Engineering
Computer Engineering
Electrical & Electronics Engineering
Environmental Engineering
Food Engineering
Geological Engineering
Geomatics Engineering
Hydrogeological Engineering
Industrial Engineering
Mining Engineering
Nuclear Engineering
Physics Engineering
Mechanical Engineering (Automotive Engineering)
 Faculty of Fine Arts :
Ceramics
Graphic Arts
Interior Architecture And Environmental Design
Painting
Sculpture
 Faculty of Health Sciences
Child Development
Nursing
Nutrition and Dietetics
Occupational Therapy
 Faculty of Law
 Faculty of Physical Therapy and Rehabilitation
 Faculty of Letters
American Culture and Literature,
Archaeology,
English Language and Literature,
French Language and Literature,
German Language and Literature,
History,
History of Art,
Information Management,
Linguistics,
Philosophy,
Psychology,
Sociology,
Translation and Interpreting
English Translation and Interpreting
French Translation and Interpreting
German Translation and Interpreting
Turkish Language and Literature
Turkish Folkloristics

The Faculty Of Letters was established as Faculty of Science and Humanities in 1967, inaugurated between 1968 and 1969, and divided into Faculty of Literature and Faculty of Economics and Administrative Sciences on 20 July 1982. The Faculty of Letters has the highest student population of the university and has 15 academic units. It is at Beytepe Campus, Ankara. This faculty has been publishing Edebiyat Fakültesi Dergisi since 1983. The journal is published biannually. It contains news and innovations of humanities along with essays by Turkish and international authors.

 Faculty of MedicineMedicine (Turkish Medium)
Medicine (English Medium)
 Faculty of Medicine at Kastamonu Faculty of Pharmacy Faculty of ScienceActuarial Sciences
Biology
Chemistry
Mathematics
Statistics

 Schools 
 School of Foreign LanguagesBasic English Division
English Preparatory Division
German Preparatory Division
French Preparatory Division
 School of Sports Science and Technology'''

Institutes
 Atatürk Institute for Modern Turkish History
 Institute of Child Health
 Institute of Population Studies
 Institute of Pure & Applied Sciences
 Institute of Social Sciences
 Institute of Health Sciences
 Institute of Fine Arts
 Institute of Public Health
 Institute of Neurological Sciences
 Institute of Nuclear Sciences
 Institute of Oncology
 Institute of Turkology Research
 Environmental Research and Application Center (ERAC)

Vocational schools
Bala Vocational School
Hacettepe Vocational School
Health Services Vocational School
Polatlı Health Services Vocational School
Polatlı Technical Science Vocational School
Social Sciences Vocational School

Notable people

Alumni
Bilge Yıldız – Associate Professor of Nuclear Science and Engineering, MIT
Erkan İbiş – Former Rector of Ankara University
 Erdal Beşikçioğlu – actor
 Uğur Erdener – physician specialized in ophthalmology and professor
 Çağrı Erhan – Rector of İstanbul Kemerburgaz University
 Erdal İnci – new media artist
 Tekin Bingöl – politician and doctor
 Esen K. Akpek – Bendann Professor of Ophthalmology, Johns Hopkins University School of Medicine
 Canan Dağdeviren – Assistant Professor at MIT Media Lab
 Esra Bilgiç Töre – Actress
 Burcu Özberk – Actress
 Tina Baykaner – Cardiac Electrophysiologist, Stanford University School of Medicine

See also 
 List of universities in Ankara 
 List of universities in Turkey

References 

 
1967 establishments in Turkey
Educational institutions established in 1967